Silvio Augusto González (born 8 June 1980) is an Argentine football player who last played for AEZ Zakakiou in the Cypriot Second Division. He is nicknamed Pulpo, which means "octopus" in Spanish.

González started his career with Argentinian football club Club Atlético Lanús. In Cyprus, he was one of the most admired players in AEL Limassol and played in the All-Star game during the period 2008-2009. He scored many goals and played many matches, including the Cypriot final for AEL Limassol. Gonzalez scored five goals in the cup and four goals in the league.

External links 
 Silvio González at BDFA.com.ar 

1980 births
Living people
Sportspeople from Buenos Aires Province
Argentine footballers
Argentine expatriate footballers
Argentine people of Spanish descent
Argentine Primera División players
Segunda División players
Categoría Primera A players
Cypriot First Division players
Club Atlético Lanús footballers
Arsenal de Sarandí footballers
San Lorenzo de Almagro footballers
Club Atlético Banfield footballers
Córdoba CF players
CD Numancia players
Olympiakos Nicosia players
AEL Limassol players
Aris Limassol FC players
Expatriate footballers in Colombia
Expatriate footballers in Cyprus
Expatriate footballers in Greece
Expatriate footballers in Spain
Argentine expatriate sportspeople in Greece
Argentine expatriate sportspeople in Spain
Argentine expatriate sportspeople in Colombia
Argentine expatriate sportspeople in Cyprus
Association football forwards